Španov vrh, at , is a peak in the Western Karawanks above the village of Planina pod Golico, Slovenia. Like Golica, it is a popular destination for tourists during the flowering of wild white narcissi, swathes of which cover its pastures in late April and early May. It is visited throughout the year as an easy peak to reach with panoramic views of the Julian Alps and Golica and the surrounding peaks in the Karawanks.

The ski route winds down the slopes of Španov vrh. The ski area is suitable for recreational and more demanding skiers. Since 1967 a carnival ski event called Svinjska glava is organized every year before Lent. The chairlift only runs during the winter period when there is enough snow for skiing. There is a convenient parking area and some overnight accommodation available in Planina pod Golico.

External links
 Information about skiing in Španov vrh on the Slovene Tourist Board site

Mountains of Upper Carniola
Karawanks
One-thousanders of Slovenia
Mountains of the Alps